Elisabeth Gunilla Andreassen (born 28 March 1958), also known as just Bettan, is a Norwegian-Swedish singer who has finished both first and second in the Eurovision Song Contest.

Career
Her talent was discovered in 1979 by Swedish musician and TV host Lasse Holm. She was produced by Bert Karlsson's label Mariann Grammofon AB. In 1980, she joined Lasse's group Chips. Chips participated in the Eurovision Song Contest 1982 with the song "Dag efter dag" ("Day After Day"), and reached 8th place.

Andreassen is active in many musical genres such as country, schlager, and musicals. She is mostly famous from Eurovision Song Contest 1985 when she and Hanne Krogh participated as Bobbysocks with the song "La det swinge", and won.

Andreassen has sung in various genres such as country, pop, rock and in musicals. She plays three instruments; guitar, piano and contrabass. She has also been a revue and musical artist.

"Bettan" has a record as the woman with the most participations in the Eurovision Song Contest, tied with Sue of Peter, Sue & Marc, and Valentina Monetta. She has participated four times, three times in duets (with Kikki Danielsson in 1982, Hanne Krogh in 1985, and Jan Werner Danielsen in 1994) and once on her own (in 1996).

Personal life
Born on 28 March 1958 in Gothenburg, Sweden, to Norwegian parents. She lives in Ullern, Oslo, in Norway with her two daughters, born in 1995 and 1997. Elisabeth married Tor Andreassen on 2 July 1994 and after that she took his last name. On 13 June 2016 her husband died of a heart attack.

Hits
Då lyser en sol (1981)
Killen ner' på Konsum svär att han är Elvis (There's a Guy Works down the Chipchop Swears he's Elvis) (1981)
Together Again (1981)
God morgon  (Good Morning) (1981) (as Chips)
Dag efter dag (Day after Day) (1982) (as Chips)
La det swinge  (Let it swing) (1985) (as Bobbysocks)
Ängel i natt (1985)
Tissel Tassel (1985)
Waiting for the Morning (1986) (as Bobbysocks)
Danse mot vår (Serenade to Spring) (1992)
I evighet (Eternity) (1996) (Wir sind dabei) (1998)
Pepita dansar (1997)
Lys og varme (2001)
Vem é dé du vill ha (2002) (as Kikki, Bettan & Lotta)

Eurovision Song Contest
Altogether, Elisabeth has participated in the Swedish Melodifestivalen, Norwegian Melodi Grand Prix and the Eurovision Song Contest twelve times, plus two as presenter.

Melodifestivalen
1981. Chips - "God morgon" (Good morning), 2nd place
1982. Chips - "Dag efter dag" (Day after day), 1st place
1984. Elisabeth Andreasson - "Kärleksmagi", 6th place (last)
1990. Elisabeth Andreasson - "Jag ser en stjärna falla", 7th place
2000. TV-host, with nine other artists.
2002. Kikki, Bettan & Lotta - "Vem é dé du vill ha", 3rd place
2011. Elisabeth Andreassen - "Vaken i en dröm", 8th place in semi

Melodi Grand Prix
1985. Bobbysocks - "La det swinge" (Let it swing), 1st place
1992. TV-host, with Jahn Teigen
1994. Elisabeth Andreasson and Jan Werner Danielsen - "Duett" (Duet), 1st place
1996. Elisabeth Andreassen - "I evighet" (Eternity), 1st place
1998. Elisabeth Andreassen - "Winds of the Northern Sea", 2nd place
2003. Kikki, Bettan & Lotta - "Din hånd i min hånd", 4th place
2015. Elisabeth Andreassen & Tor Endresen - "All over the world", 4th place

Eurovision Song Contest
1982. Chips - "Dag efter dag", 8th place, Sweden
1985. Bobbysocks - "La det swinge", 1st place, Norway
1994. Elisabeth Andreasson & Jan Werner Danielsen - "Duett", 6th place, Norway
1996. Elisabeth Andreassen - "I evighet", 2nd place, Norway

Discography

Chips
God morgon/It Takes More than a Minute (1981) - Single
Having a Party (1982)
Dag efter dag/Här kommer solen (1982) - Single
20 bästa låtar (1997) - Compilation album

Kikki, Bettan & Lotta
20 år med oss - Vem é dé du vill ha (2002)
Vem é dé du vill ha (2002) - Single
Live från Rondo (2003)

Solo
Angel of the Morning (1981)
I'm a Woman (1983)
Elisabeth Andreasson (1985)
Greatest Hits Vol. 2 (1985)
Greatest Hits (1986)
Älskar, älskar ej (1988)
Elisabeth (1990)
Stemninger (1992 to 1994)
Julestemninger (1993)
Elisabeth Andreassens bästa 1981-1995 (1995)
Eternity (1996)
Bettans jul (1996)
Så skimrande var aldrig havet (1997)
20 bästa (1998)
Kjærlighetsviser (2001)
A Couple of Days in Larsville (2004)
Short Stories (2005)
Bettan Country (2007)
Spellemann (2009)
Julenatt (2009)
Kärleken & livet (2012)"
De fineste (2014)

See also
Bobbysocks
Eurovision Song Contest
Eurovision Song Contest 1985
Eurovision Song Contest 1996
Melodi Grand Prix
Melodifestivalen
Hanne Krogh

References

External links

Official website

1958 births
Eurovision Song Contest entrants for Norway
Eurovision Song Contest entrants for Sweden
Eurovision Song Contest entrants of 1982
Eurovision Song Contest entrants of 1985
Eurovision Song Contest entrants of 1994
Eurovision Song Contest entrants of 1996
Eurovision Song Contest winners
Living people
Melodi Grand Prix contestants
Norwegian country singers
Norwegian women guitarists
Norwegian women pianists
Norwegian pop singers
Norwegian rock singers
Melodi Grand Prix winners
Norwegian multi-instrumentalists
Grappa Music artists
Women guitarists
Singers from Gothenburg
20th-century Norwegian women singers
20th-century Norwegian singers
21st-century Norwegian women singers
21st-century Norwegian singers
21st-century pianists
Bobbysocks! members
Kikki, Bettan & Lotta members
Chips (band) members
20th-century women pianists
21st-century women pianists
Melodifestivalen contestants of 2011
Melodifestivalen contestants of 2002
Melodifestivalen contestants of 1990